Constitution of Nepal 2015 is the present governing Constitution of Nepal.
Nepal is governed according to the Constitution which came into effect on 20 September 2015, replacing the Interim Constitution of 2007. The constitution of Nepal is divided into 35 parts, 308 Articles and 9 Schedules.

The Constitution was drafted by the Second Constituent Assembly following the failure of the First Constituent Assembly to produce a constitution in its mandated period after the devastating earthquake in April 2015.  The constitution was endorsed by 90% of the total legislators. Out of 598 Constituent Assembly members, 538 voted in favour of the constitution while 60 people voted against it, including a few Terai-based political parties which refrained from the voting process.

Its institutions were put in place in 2010 and 2018 through a series of direct and indirect elections in all governing levels.

History
The Interim Constitution provided for a Constituent Assembly, which was charged with writing Nepal's temporary constitution.  Under the terms of the Interim Constitution, the new constitution was to be promulgated by 28 April 2010, but the Constituent Assembly postponed the promulgation by a year because of disagreements. On 25 May 2011, the Supreme Court of Nepal ruled that the 2010 extension of the Interim Constitution was not right. Since 29 May 2011 the Constituent Assembly repeatedly extended the Interim Constitution.

On 28 May 2012, the Constituent Assembly was dissolved after it failed to finish the constitution after the latest extension, ending four years of constitution drafting and leaving the country in a legal vacuum.
New elections were held on 19 November 2013 to the Second Nepalese Constituent Assembly and political leaders pledged to draft a new constitution within a year. The new assembly expressly committed that the new constitution would be promulgated on 22 January 2015. However, due to continued differences on key issues including system of governance, judicial system and federation issues like number, name and areas of the states to be carved, the constitution could not be finalized and promulgated in time.

Features 
The constitution is largely written in gender-neutral terms. Some of the important aspects of the constitution include the following:
 The Constitution restructured Nepal into a federal republic. The Constitution divided the nation into seven provinces and completed the transition of Nepal from constitutional monarchy to republicanism and from a unitary system to federalism.
The Federal system is established with three tiers, Federal Government, Provincial Level, and Local Level. The guiding principles of the 'Holding Together' type of Nepalese federal system are based on Co-existence, Co-operation, and Coordination (3Cs).
 Nepal is defined in article 4 as an "independent, indivisible, sovereign, secular, inclusive, democratic, socialism-oriented, federal democratic republican state." 
 A bicameral parliamentary system was created with two Federal houses and unicameral parliamentary systems in each province.
 A mixed electoral system was adopted for the elections of the lower Federal house with both first-past-the-post and proportional electoral aspects used to elect members.
 The rights of gender and sexual minorities are protected by the new constitution with provisions of special laws to protect, empower and develop minority groups as well as allowing them to get citizenship in their chosen gender.
 The rights of women were explicitly recognized, the constitution stating that “women shall have an equal ancestral right without any gender-based discrimination”.
 Acts leading to conversions from one religion to another were banned, and acts that undermine or jeopardize the religion of another prohibited. At the same time, the constitution declares the nation to be secular and neutral toward all religions.
 Nepal also has continued not to use the death penalty. Nepal had abolished capital punishment in 1990 after the promulgation of that year's Constitution of the Kingdom of Nepal.

Preamble
The preamble of the constitution of Nepal states the follows:

" We, the Sovereign People of Nepal,

internalizing the people's sovereign right and right to autonomy and self-rule, while maintaining freedom, sovereignty, territorial integrity, national unity, independence and dignity of Nepal,

recalling the glorious history of historic people's movements, armed conflict, dedication and sacrifice undertaken by the Nepalese people at times for the interest of the nation, democracy and progressive changes, and respecting for the martyrs and disappeared and victim citizens,

ending all forms of discrimination and oppression created by the feudalistic, autocratic, centralized, unitary system of governance, protecting and promoting social and cultural solidarity, tolerance and harmony, and unity in diversity by recognizing the multi-ethnic, multi-lingual, multi-religious, multi-cultural and diverse regional characteristics, resolving to build an egalitarian society founded on the proportional inclusive and participatory principles in order to ensure economic equality, prosperity and social justice, by eliminating discrimination based on class, caste, region, language, religion and gender and all forms of caste-based untouchability, and

being committed to socialism based on democratic norms and values including the people's competitive multi-party democratic system of governance, civil liberties, fundamental rights, human rights, adult franchise, periodic elections, full freedom of the press, and independent, impartial and competent judiciary and concept of the rule of law, and build a prosperous nation,

do hereby pass and promulgate this Constitution, through the Constituent Assembly, in order to fulfill the aspirations for sustainable peace, good governance, development and prosperity through the federal, democratic, republican, system of governance."

In Nepali:

" हामी सार्वभौमसत्तासम्पन्न नेपाली जनता;

नेपालको स्वतन्त्रता, सार्वभौमिकता, भौगोलिक अखण्डता, राष्ट्रिय एकता, स्वाधीनता र स्वाभिमानलाई अक्षुण्ण राखी जनताको सार्वभौम अधिकार, स्वायत्तता र स्वशासनको अधिकारलाई आत्मसात् गर्दै;

राष्ट्रहित, लोकतन्त्र र अग्रगामी परिवर्तनका लागि नेपाली जनताले पटक– पटक गर्दै आएका ऐतिहासिक जन आन्दोलन, सशस्त्र संघर्ष, त्याग र बलिदानको गौरवपूर्ण इतिहासलाई स्मरण एवं शहीदहरू तथा बेपत्ता र पीडित नागरिकहरूलाई सम्मान गर्दै;

सामन्ती, निरंकुश, केन्द्रीकृत र एकात्मक राज्यव्यवस्थाले सृजना गरेका सबै प्रकारका विभेद र उत्पीडनको अन्त्य गर्दै;

बहुजातीय, बहुभाषिक, बहुधार्मिक, बहुसांस्कृतिक तथा भौगोलिक विविधतायुक्त विशेषतालाई आत्मसात् गरी विविधताबीचको एकता, सामाजिक सांस्कृतिक ऐक्यबद्धता, सहिष्णुता र सद्भावलाई संरक्षण एवं प्रवर्धन गर्दै; वर्गीय, जातीय, क्षेत्रीय, भाषिक, धार्मिक, लैंगिक विभेद र सबै प्रकारका जातीय छुवाछूतको अन्त्य गरी आर्थिक समानता, समृद्धि र सामाजिक न्याय सुनिश्चित गर्न समानुपातिक समावेशी र सहभागितामूलक सिद्धान्तका आधारमा समतामूलक समाजको निर्माण गर्ने संकल्प गर्दै;

जनताको प्रतिस्पर्धात्मक बहुदलीय लोकतान्त्रिक शासन प्रणाली, नागरिक स्वतन्त्रता, मौलिक अधिकार, मानव अधिकार, बालिग मताधिकार, आवधिक निर्वाचन, पूर्ण प्रेस स्वतन्त्रता तथा स्वतन्त्र, निष्पक्ष र सक्षम न्यायपालिका र कानूनी राज्यको अवधारणा लगायतका लोकतान्त्रिक मूल्य र मान्यतामा आधारित समाजवादप्रति प्रतिबद्ध रही समृद्ध राष्ट्र निर्माण गर्न;

संघीय लोकतान्त्रिक गणतन्त्रात्मक शासन व्यवस्थाको माध्यमद्वारा दिगो शान्ति, सुशासन, विकास र समृद्धिको आकांक्षा पूरा गर्न संविधान सभाबाट पारित गरी यो संविधान जारी गर्दछौं । "

Previous Constitutions of Nepal
In the 68-year history of constitutional development up to this Constitution, Nepal experienced 7 different constitutions in different time periods, with previous constitutions being enacted in 1948, 1951, 1959, 1962, 1990, and 2007.

The Nepal Government Act 1948
In 2004 Bikram Sambat, the Government of Nepal Act was enacted. Since the mid-nineteenth century, the country had been a monarchy where the prime ministers, from the Rana dynasty, had sweeping control over the affairs of the state. The 1948 (Common Era) document introduced limited democratic elements, but the experiment was not successful due to the misgivings of the Rana rulers to give away power. This constitution was declared on 26 January 1948 by PM Padma Shumsher. The constitution was formed under the chairmanship of Padma Shumsher and three Indian Scholars had helped him to prepare this document. The three Indian Scholars who contributed during its writing were Prakash Gupta, Raghunath Singh and Ram Ugra Singh. It consisted of 6 parts, 68 articles and 1 schedule.

Nepal Interim Government Act 1951
The Interim Government of Nepal Act 1951 was promulgated after the Revolution of 1951 at the end of the Rana period. This text strengthened the authority of the king, and introduced relevant reforms such as the creation of the Supreme Court and the inclusion of fundamental rights and socio-economic goals to be pursued by the state. This constitution was promulgated on 11 April 1951 by King Tribhuwan. It consisted of 7 parts, 73 articles and 1 schedule.

Constitution of the Kingdom of Nepal, 1959

The Constitution of the Kingdom of Nepal, 1959 followed the previously mentioned interim text. Despite the establishment of a bicameral parliament, the king continued to hold important powers such as the prerogative to appoint half of the members of the Senate and the suspension of parliament under certain circumstances. This constitution was drafted under the chairmanship of Bhagawati Pd Singh. The constitution drafting commission included members like Surya Pd Upadhyaya, Ranabir Subba, Hari Prashad Joshi. Sir Ivor Jennings was an advisor in this committee. This constitution was promulgated on 12 February 1959. It consisted of 10 parts, 77 articles and 3 schedules.

Constitution of Nepal 1962

The democratic experiment was short-lived, as in 1962 a new constitution came in to eliminate political parties, and to introduce the panchayat system. In this model, panchayats were councils organized at the local level, presumably to ensure the representation of citizens. However, the king exercised much stronger authority than in the 1959 regime and could modify the constitution or suspend it in case of emergency. This constitution was promulgated on 16 December 1962 by King Mahendra. It consisted of 20 parts, 97 articles and 6 schedules.

Constitution of the Kingdom of Nepal, 1990

In 1990, the first Jana Andolan, Popular Revolt, brought multi-party democracy back to Nepal. The Constitution of the Kingdom of Nepal, 1990 lifted the ban on political parties, described a democratic representative system where the authority of the king was curtailed, and enshrined fundamental rights. Although the 1990 constitution substantially increased the democratic character of the state in comparison with the Panchayat Regime, critiques have argued that this text did not adequately represent all sectors of society even though Nepal was a multi-cultural country where diverse social groups coexist. This constitution was promulgated on 9 November 1990 by King Birendra. It consisted of 23 parts, 133 articles and 3 schedules. This constitution was repealed by the current constitution of Nepal.

The Interim constitution of Nepal, 2007
Again following the 2007 democracy movement in Nepal, The Interim constitution of Nepal was promulgated in 2007. This constitution was promulgated on 15 January 2007. It consisted of 25 parts, 167 articles and 4 schedules. It has articles on citizenship, fundamental rights, responsibilities, directive principles and policies of the State, the Executive, Legislature-Parliament, the Constituent Assembly, the legislative procedure, the financial procedure, the Judiciary, the Commission for the Investigation of Abuse of Authority, the Auditor General, the Public Service Commission, the Election Commission, the National Human Rights Commission, the Attorney General, structure of State and local self-governance, political parties, emergency powers, provisions regarding the army, amendment of the Constitution and transitional provisions.

Parts 
The Constitution has 35 parts:

 Preliminary
 Citizenship
 Fundamental Rights and Duties
 Directive Principles, Policies, and Responsibilities of the State
 Structure of State and Distribution of State Power
 President and Vice-president
 Federal Executive
 Federal Legislature
 Federal Legislative Procedure
 Federal Financial Procedures
 Judiciary
 Attorney General
 Provincial Executive
 Provincial Legislature
 Provincial Legislative Procedure
 Financial Procedures of Province
 Local Executive
 Local Legislature
 Local Financial Procedure
 Interrelationship between the Federation, Provinces and Local Levels
 Commission for the Investigation of Abuse of Authority
 Auditor General
 Public Service Commission
 Election Commission
 National Human Rights Commission
 National Natural Resources and Fiscal Commission
 Other Commissions
 Provision regarding National Security
 Provision relating to Political Parties
 Emergency Power
 Amendment of the Constitution
 Miscellaneous
 Transitional Provisions
 Definitions and Interpretations
 Short title, Commencement and Repeal

Citizenship Provisions 

The conditions to be fulfilled to be a Nepalese Citizen are outlined below (Copied from Section 11, Part 2, Constitution of Nepal, 2015) (final)

(1) The persons who have acquired citizenship of Nepal at the commencement of this Constitution and the persons who are eligible to acquire citizenship of Nepal under this Part shall be deemed to be the citizens of Nepal.

(2) The following persons who have their permanent domicile in Nepal shall be deemed to be citizens of Nepal by descent:-

 A person who has acquired the citizenship of Nepal by descent before the commencement of this constitution.
 Any person whose father or mother was a citizen of Nepal at the birth of such a person.

(3) A child of a citizen who has acquired citizenship of Nepal by birth before the commencement of this Constitution shall, if his/her father and mother both are the citizens of Nepal, shall be entitled to Nepali citizenship by descent upon his/her attaining the age of maturity.

(4) Every child found in Nepal whereabouts of whose paternity and maternity is not known shall, until the mother or father is traced, be deemed a citizen of Nepal by descent.

(5) A person born to a Nepali citizen mother and having his/her domicile in Nepal but whose father is not traced, shall be conferred the Nepali citizenship by descent.

Provided that in case his/her father is found to be a foreigner, the citizenship of such a person shall be converted to naturalized citizenship according to the Federal law.

(6) If a foreign woman married to a Nepali citizen so wishes, she may acquire naturalized citizenship of Nepal as provided for in a Federal law.

(7) Notwithstanding anything contained elsewhere in this Article, in case of a person born to Nepali woman citizen married to a foreign citizen, he/she may acquire naturalized citizenship of Nepal as provided for by a Federal law if he/she is having the permanent domicile in Nepal and he/she has not acquired citizenship of the foreign country.

Provided that if his/her father and mother both are the citizen of Nepal at the time of acquisition of the citizenship, he/she, if born in Nepal, may acquire citizenship by descent.

(8) Except provided for in this Article, Government of Nepal may confer naturalized citizenship of Nepal according to Federal law.

(9) Government of Nepal may confer honorary citizenship according to Federal law.

(10) In case any area is annexed into Nepal by merger, the persons having domicile in such area shall be citizens of Nepal subject to a Federal law.

Fundamental rights guaranteed in the Constitution (Part 3)
There are 31 fundamental rights guaranteed by the constitution of Nepal in part -3 (Fundamental Rights and Duties). They are
 Right to Live with Dignity (Article 16)
 Right to Freedom (Article 17)
 Right to Equality (Article 18)
 Right to Communication (Article 19)
 Rights relating to Justice (Article 20)
 Right of Victim of Crime (Article 21)
 Right against Torture (Article 22)
 Right against Preventive Detention (Article 23)
 Right against Untouchability and Discrimination (Article 24)
 Right relating to Property (Article 25)
 Right to Freedom of Religion (Article 26)
 Right to Information (Article 27)
 Right to Privacy (Article 28)
 Right against Exploitation (Article 29)
 Right to Clean Environment (Article 30)
 Right relating to Education (Article 31)
 Right to Language and Culture (Article 32)
 Right to Employment (Article 33)
 Right to Labour (Article 34)
 Right relating to Health (Article 35)
 Right relating to Food (Article 36)
 Right to Housing (Article 37)
 Rights of Women (Article 38)
 Rights of the Child (Article 39)
 Rights of Dalit (Article 40)
 Rights of Senior Citizens (Article 41)
 Right to Social Justice (Article 42)
 Right to Social Security (Article 43)
 Right of the Consumer (Article 44)
 Right against Exile (Article 45)
 Right to Constitutional Remedies (Article 46)

Constitutional Organs
The constitutional organs of Nepal form Part 21-27:

 Commission for the Investigation of Abuse of Authority (CIAA)  (Part 21)
 Office of the Auditor General (Part 22)
 Public Service Commission (Part 23)
 Election Commission (Part 24)
 National Human Rights Commission (Part 25)
 National Natural Resources and Fiscal Commission (Part 26)
 Other Commissions (Part 27) :
 National Women Commission
 National Dalit Commission
 National Inclusion Commission
 National Aborigines Commission
 Madhesi Commission
 Tharu Commission
 Muslim Commission

Schedules 
The Constitution has 9 schedules:

	Nepali National Flag
 National Anthem of Nepal
	Coat of Arms of Nepal
	Provinces and Districts within provinces
	List of Federal Powers/Jurisdiction
	List of Provincial Powers/Jurisdiction
	List of Concurrent (federal and provincial) powers/jurisdiction
	List of Powers/Jurisdiction for Local Level
	List of Concurrent Powers/Jurisdiction for Federation, Province and Local Level

See also

Constitutional economics
Constitutionalism
2015 Nepal blockade

References

Further reading
 BBC News. Why is Nepal's new constitution controversial?. 19 September 2015.

External links
 Constitution of Nepal 2072 B.S
 Constituent Assembly of Nepal
  – in Kathmandu has a wide range of news and other information about the constitution-drafting process, in English and Nepali.
 Theology at the heart of Nepal’s constitutional crisis – Lapido Media 26/05/2010
 
 Final Interim Constitution of Nepal, 2063 (2007) – in English and Nepali at worldstatesmen.org
 Final Interim Constitution of Nepal, 2063 (2007) – at the Nepalese Supreme Court 
 
  – by Ellingson, T., Himalayan Research Bulletin, the University of Texas, Vol. XI, Nos. 1–3, 1991.
 

 
Government of Nepal
Provisional constitutions
Nepal
2015 establishments in Nepal
Constituent Assembly of Nepal